The Hmong people are an ethnic group currently native to several countries, believed to have come from the Yangtze river basin area in southern China. The Hmong are known in China as the Miao, which encompasses not only Hmong, but also other related groups such as Hmu, Qo Xiong and A-Hmao. There is debate about usage of this term, especially amongst Hmong living in the West, as it is believed by some to be derogatory, although Hmong living in China still call themselves by this name. Throughout recorded history, the Hmong have remained identifiable as Hmong because they have maintained the Hmong language, customs, and ways of life while adopting the ways of the country in which they live. In the 1960s and 1970s, many Hmong were secretly recruited by the American CIA to fight against communism during the Vietnam War. After American armed forces pulled out of Vietnam, a communist regime took over in Laos and ordered the prosecution and re-education of all those who had fought against its cause during the war. While many Hmong are still left in Laos, Thailand, Vietnam, Myanmar, and China (which houses one of the biggest Hmong populations in the world, 5 million), since 1975 many Hmong have fled Laos in fear of persecution. Housed in Thai refugee camps during the 1980s, many have resettled in countries such as the United States, French Guiana, Australia, France, Germany, as well as some who have chosen to stay in Thailand in hope of returning to their own land. In the United States, new generations of Hmong are gradually assimilating into American society while being taught Hmong culture and history by their elders. Many fear that as the older generations pass on, the knowledge of the Hmong among Hmong Americans will die as well.

Social organization
The clan (xeem) has been a dominant organizing force in Hmong society. There are about eighteen Hmong clans that are known in Laos and Thailand. Clan membership is inherited upon birth or occasionally through adoption. All children are members of the father’s clan, through which they will trace their ancestors. Women become members of their husband's family upon marriage but will retain their clan name of their father. Members of the same clan consider each other to be kwv tij, translated as "brothers", "siblings," and they are expected to offer one another mutual support. The term kwv tij is regarded as one's father's family or in the case of women who are married it refers to their in-laws. A related term neej tsa is the wife family after marriage. However, she regards her birth family to be her kwv tij until she is married.  Also, many clans even consider each last name as kwv tij Example: Khang, Kue, and Kong are kwv tij because they share a history of helping each other and respect for each other. Respected clan leaders are expected to take responsibility for conflict negotiation and occasionally the maintenance of religious rituals. Members of a clan who share the same ritual practices may identify as a group on the sub-clan level.

Marriage

Clan groups are exogamous: that is, Hmong may not marry within their own clan group; a marriage partner must be found from another clan. For example, a Xiong may not marry another Xiong. However, they are allowed to marry blood relatives from their mother's side (Neejtsa). This allows for such cases as two cousins related through their mother to marry, so long as they are in different clans. Traditionally, when a boy wants to marry a girl, he will make his intentions clear, and will "zij" or snatch (In western countries this act is not popular and is considered to be illegal) her at any opportunity that is appropriate. This is traditionally only a symbolic kidnapping.

Before he may "zij" her, the boy must first give a gift to the girl whom he wants to marry. After waiting a few days, the boy may then "zij" the girl. If the boy never gave the girl a gift, she is allowed to refuse and return home with any family member who comes to save her. The parents are not notified at the time of the "zij", but an envoy from the boy's clan is sent to inform them of the whereabouts of their daughter and her safety (fi xov). This envoy gives them the boy's family background and asks for the girl's in exchange. For example, the envoy may tell the girl's family that the groom is from a Stripe Hmong family from Luang Prabang, Laos; the bride's parents may then reply that they are Moob Leej/Mong Leng from Nong Het, Xieng Khouang, Laos. Before the new couple enters the groom's house, the groom's father performs a blessing ritual, asking the ancestors to accept the new bride into the household (Lwm qaib). The head of the household moves the chicken in a circular motion around the couple's head. The girl is not allowed to visit anyone's house for three days after this.

After three days or more, the groom's parents will prepare the first wedding feast for the newlywed couple (hu plig nyab tshiab thaum puv peb tag kis). The wedding is usually a two-day process. At the end of this first wedding feast, the couple will return to the bride's family's home, where they spend the night preparing for the next day. On the second day, the family of the bride prepares a second wedding feast at their home, where the couple will be married (Noj tshoob). Hmong marriage customs differ slightly based on cultural subdivisions within the global Hmong community, but all require the exchange of a bride price from the groom’s family to the bride’s family.

The bride price is compensation for the new family taking the other family's daughter, as the girl's parents are now short one person to help with chores (the price of the girl can vary based on her value or on the parents). The elders of both families negotiate the amount prior to the engagement and is traditionally paid in bars of silver or livestock. In modern times, settlements made in monetary terms are also common.

During the bride's time with the groom's family, she will wear their clan's traditional clothes. She will switch back to the clothes of her birth clan while visiting her family on the second day of the wedding. After the wedding is over, her parents will give her farewell presents and new sets of clothes. Before the couple departs, the bride's family provides the groom with drinks until he feels he can't drink anymore, though he will often share with any brothers he has. At this point the bride's older brother or uncle will often offer the groom one more drink and ask him to promise to treat the bride well, never hit her, etc. Finishing the drink is seen as proof that the groom will keep his promise. Upon arriving back at the groom's house, another party is held to thank the negotiator(s), the groomsman, and the bride's maid (tiam mej koob).

During and post-wedding, there are many rules or superstitious beliefs a bride must follow. Here are some examples: 
 When the groom's wedding party is departing from the bride's house, during that process, the bride must never look back for it is to be a bad omen endured into her marriage. 
 During the wedding feast, there are to be no spicy dishes or hot sauces served for it will make the marriage bitter.
 At some point during the wedding, an elder would come to ask the bride if she has old gifts or mementos from past lovers. She is to forfeit these items.
 The bridesmaid's, known as the green lady, job is to make sure the bride does not run off with a man as, historically, many girls were forced to marry and would elope with their current or past lovers.

In the 21st century, Hmong people who practice Christianity may follow traditional Hmong weddings; however, some rituals such as "lwm qaib" and "hu plig" are no longer practiced. Some of them follow both traditional Hmong weddings and westernized weddings.

When a husband dies, it is his clan's responsibility to look after the widow and children. The widow is permitted to remarry, in which case she would have two choices: she may marry one of her husband's younger brothers/ younger cousins (never the older brothers) or she can marry anyone from an outside clan (besides her own). If she chooses to marry an extended member from her deceased husband's clan, her children will continue to be a part of that clan. If she chooses to remarry outside of her deceased husband's clan, her children are not required to stay with the clan unless a member of the clan (usually the deceased husband's brother or a male cousin of the same last name) is willing to take care of the children. (This is mostly the practice today in many Western Nations). If no one from the deceased husband's clan is willing to raise the children, they will follow their mother into her second marriage. Once the children go with their mother to be a part of their stepfather's family, a spiritual ceremony may take place. The children can choose to belong to their stepfather's clan (by accepting his surname, his family spirits, and relatives) or they can choose to remain with their original clan (the family, spirits, and relatives of their deceased father). Often, regardless of the wishes of the mother or children, the clan would keep the son(s).

Polygamy is a form of marriage among the Hmong, it has been documented. It is rare among those Hmong who have migrated to Western nations.

Divorce was rare in traditional Hmong society, however, it is becoming more prevalent in westernized Hmong communities. If a husband and wife decide to divorce, the couple's clans will permit divorce but will evaluate the situation fairly. If just the wife wants to divorce her husband without any firm grounds, the bride price must be returned to the husband’s family, as the wife will be the one choosing to leave the household. If just the husband wants to divorce his wife without any firm grounds, the husband will have to come up with some money to send the wife back to her family with all the daughters and the sons will stay with the husband, as the husband will be the one choosing to leave the household. By tradition, the man and the woman do not have equal custody of all the children. If it is determined the wife had committed adultery, the husband will receive custody of the sons, the bride price and an additional fine. However, if it is determined the husband had committed adultery or married a second wife and the wife can not continue being part of the family, she will have the option to peg the husband. If the husband allows it, she can take her children with her. If a divorced man dies, custody of any male children passes to his clan group.

Traditional gender roles
Traditional gender roles throughout Hmong society have changed throughout the dominance in China along with Confucianism. 
During the periods in which Confucianism reached its peaks (206 BCE – 220 CE) along with Legalism (法家) or Taoism (道家) during the Han Dynasty. Although the early Hmong had no real commitment to the subordination of women, over time Confucian teachings were expanded upon. It was during the Han dynasty (206 BCE – 220 CE) that Confucianism was adopted as the government's state doctrine in China, becoming part of official education. 
In later dynasties, Neo-Confucian interpretations further reinforced male authority and patrilineal customs. According to the Confucian structure of society, women at every level were to occupy a position lower than men. Most citizens accepted the subservience of women to men as natural and proper. At the same time, they accorded women's honor and power as mother and mother-in-law within their family.

There are traditional gender roles in Hmong society.  A man's duty involves family responsibility and the provision for the physical and spiritual welfare of his family. Hmong men have a system for making decisions that involve clan leaders. Husbands may consult their wives if they wish before making major decisions regarding family affairs, but the husband is seen as the head of the household who announces the decision.

Hmong women are responsible for nurturing the children, preparing meals, feeding animals, and sharing in agricultural labor. Traditionally, Hmong women eat meals only after the Hmong men have eaten first, especially if there are guests present in the house.

Spirituality
See also: Hmong folk religion

Contemporary Hmong people cannot be characterized as subscribing to a single belief system. Missionaries to Southeast Asia converted many Hmong people to Christianity beginning in the 19th-century and many more have become Christian since immigrating from Southeast Asia to the West. However, most Hmong people, both in Asia and the West, continue to maintain traditional spiritual practices that include shamanism, and ancestor veneration.

These spiritual beliefs are combined with their beliefs related to health and illness. In traditional Hmong spiritual practices, one does not separate the physical well-being of a person from their spiritual health; the spiritual realm is highly influential and dictates what happens in the physical world.  According to these beliefs, everything possesses a spirit, both animate and inanimate objects. There is a delicate balance between these two worlds; thus the necessity to revere and honor the ancestors for guidance and protection.  The spirits of deceased ancestors are thought to influence the welfare and health of the living. Individuals perform rituals which include the offering of food and spirit money, pouring libation, and burning incense to appease the spirits and earn their favor.

Role - the male head of the household does the worshipping of ancestral spirits. However, it is not surprising to find women also partake in this role. Rituals performed by the head of the household “in honor of the ancestral spirits” are for individual benefits which are usually done during Hmong New Year celebrations. It is mainly to call upon the spirits of the house to protect the house.

Each person is thought to have 12 parts of the soul. These parts must remain in harmony to remain healthy. Some parts have specific roles. One of the 12 parts is reincarnated or join a living relative or descendant after death while the main part returns to the home of the ancestors into the spirit world and stays near the grave of the deceased. The soul of the living can fall into disharmony and may even leave the body. The loss of a soul or parts (poob plig) can cause serious illness. The number of parts lost determines how serious the illness is.  A soul-calling ceremony (hu plig) can be performed by shamans, when the soul has been frightened away, within the community to entice the soul home with chanting and offerings of food. Shamans perform rituals because they are the ones who have special access to go in contact with souls or spirits, or in other words, the otherworld. Rituals are usually performed to restore the health of an individual, or family, and call one’s wandering spirit back home. For soul calling, there are a couple of different ceremonies; One usually done by the head of the household and one by the shaman.

Animism and shamanism
For followers of traditional Hmong spirituality, the shaman, a healing practitioner who acts as an intermediary between the spirit and material world, is the main communicator with the otherworld, able to see why and how someone got sick. The Hmong view healing and sickness as supernatural processes linked to cosmic and local supernatural forces.

In ancient times, it is said that humans and spirits used to live with each other. However, due to conflict between the two very different beings, the deity Saub had blinded the two from being able to see each other. However, there is this good and evil in both worlds and thus whenever humans come into contact with the evilness of the otherworld, a Shaman is needed to perform rituals to go rescue or call back the sick person’s spirit and/or look at the reason for why the person is so sick. A shaman’s real job is to “reproduce and restore belief”  not really the physical health, although it may seem so. Rituals, which serve as a treatment, might include herbal remedies or offerings of joss paper money or livestock. In cases of serious illness, the shaman enters a trance and travels through the spirit world to discern the cause and remedy of the problem, usually involving the loss or damage of a soul.

This ritual ceremony, called "ua neeb", consists of several parts. The first part of the process is "ua neeb Saib": examining the spiritual aura of the situation to determine what the factors are.

If during ua neeb Saib the shaman observes something seriously wrong with the individual, such as a soul having lost its way home and caught by some spiritual being, the shaman will end the first part of the ceremony process by negotiating with the spiritual being ("whoever has control of this individual soul") to release the soul; most of the time this will do. After that, the shaman would lead the soul to its home.

After a waiting period, if the sick individual becomes well, then the second part of the ceremony, referred to as ua neeb kho, will be performed, in which joss paper is burned and livestock is sacrificed in exchange for the well-being and future protection of the individual's soul. Extended family and friends are invited to partake in the ceremony and tie a white string around the wrist (khi tes) of the individual. The strings are blessed by the shaman and as each person ties it around the individual's wrist, they say a personalized blessing.

Studies done within the Hmong American communities show that many Hmong continue to consult shamans for their health concerns.

A household always has a sacred wallpaper altar (a Thaj Neeb made of Xwmkab) in which when the shaman comes, he/she performs the ritual in front of it. Domestic worshipping is usually also done in front of this. This wallpaper altar serves as the main protector of the house. It is the place, wherever a household decides to place it, where worshiping, offerings (joss paper, animal, etc.), and rituals are done. In addition, Shamans also have their own personal altar that holds their special instruments and dag neeg. During a ritual, or when a shaman is under a trance, it is prohibited to walk between the altar and the shaman when the shaman is speaking directly with the otherworld.

Not everyone gets to become a shaman; they must be chosen by the spirits to become an intermediary between the spiritual realm and the physical world. In Hmong shamanism, a shaman can be a man or a woman.  Typically, there is a strong chance for an individual to become a shaman if their family history contains shamans. This is due to the belief that ancestral spirits, including the spirits of shamans, are reincarnated into the same family tree. Once blessed with the powers of a shaman, the particular individual will have to seek a teacher (which is a shaman) and he/she will begin training to become an official Shaman society can call upon. Usually, the amount of time for a shaman to be done with training depends on the spiritual guardians that guide the shaman in the process of performing the rituals (dag neeg).

People that inherit the skills to become a shaman often experience symptoms of unexplained physical illness, bipolar personality, and multi-personality/ schizophrenia. According to traditional Hmong beliefs, these symptoms are the result of shamanic spirits (dab neeb) trying to get through to the Shaman-to-be. For those that still practice Shamanism, they're able to recognize these symptoms and cure their loved ones by helping them develop into full-fledged Shamans. For those that are blessed to become a Shaman and do not want to practice Shamanism, they often turn to Christian exorcism, western medicine, and psych wards. For the few that accept becoming Shamans, it is considered an honor to help their own.  In the Hmong community, shamans are highly respected.

Treatments and Practices
Many Hmong still follow the tradition of taking herbal remedies. A common practice among Hmong women is following a strict diet after childbirth. This consists of warm rice, freshly boiled chicken with herbs (koj thiab ntiv), lemongrass, and a little salt. It is believed to be a healing process for the women. For 30 days (nyob dua hli), she will stay on this diet in order to cleanse her body of leftover blood and avoid future illness.

Kav (coining or spooning) is another form of treatment that involves using the edge of a silver coin or spoon to scrape the surface of the skin. The process begins by applying tiger balm (tshuaj luan paub) onto the areas that will be scraped to supposedly help open the pores on the body and supposedly release toxins.

Hmong festivals

Hmong New Year
One Festive Holiday the Hmong culture celebrates is the Hmong New Year celebration, which is a cultural tradition that takes place annually in selected areas where Hmong communities exist and in a modified form where smaller communities come together. During the New Year's celebration, Hmong dress in traditional clothing and enjoy Hmong traditional foods, dance, music, bullfights, and other forms of entertainment. Hmong New Year celebrations have Hmong ethnic traditions and culture, and may also serve to educate those who have an interest in Hmong tradition. Hmong New Year celebrations frequently occur in November and December (traditionally at the end of the harvest season when all work is done), serving as a Thanksgiving holiday for the Hmong people. According to folklore and legends, Hmong New Year is traditionally held on the last day of December, which then lasts until 3 or 4 days within the first few days of January.

Historically, the Hmong New Year celebration was created to give thanks to ancestors and spirits as well as to welcome in a new beginning. It is also a time of the year where Hmong people gather with family and meet with relatives from other regions. Traditionally, the celebration lasts for ten days, has been shortened in America due to the difference between the traditional Hmong farming schedule and that of the American 40-hr workweek schedule.  It has also served the double purpose of a convenient meeting place and time for the Hmong leadership, from the days of China even until now.

During the Hmong New Year celebration, the Hmong ball-tossing game pov pob is a common activity for adolescents. Boys and girls form two separate lines in pairs that are directly facing one another. Girls can ball toss with other girls or boys, but boys cannot ball toss with other boys. It is also taboo to toss the ball to someone of the same clan and date the same clan. The pairs toss a cloth ball back and forth until one member drops the ball. If a player drops or misses the ball, an ornament or item is given to the opposite player in the pair. Ornaments are recovered by singing love songs (hais kwv txhiaj) to the opposite player. but in recent times, in such areas as China, the young lovers have been seen to carry tape players to play their favorite love songs for one another.

The Hmong New Year celebration—specifically based on both religious and cultural beliefs—is an “in-house” ritual that takes place annually in every Hmong household.  The celebration is to acknowledge the completion of the rice-harvesting season—thus, the beginning of a new year—so that a new life can begin as the cycle of life continues.  During this celebration, every "wandering" soul of every family member is called back to unite with the family again and the young will honor the old or the in-laws—a ritual of asking for blessings from elders of the house and clan as well as the in-laws of other clans.

Also, during the Hmong New Year celebration, house spirits as well as the spirit of wealth (xwm kab) are honored.  In addition, if a shaman is in the house, the healing spirits of She-Yee are also honored and released to wander the land (Neeb Foob Yeem)—similar to vacationing after a long year of working—until they are called back right after the new year. Hmong New Year lasts only for 3 days—with 10 dishes of food each day, for a total of 30 dishes—thus the Hmong saying “eat 30.”  Here are a few practices that the Hmong observe during their New Year Celebration, performed anytime during the 3 days of celebration.

Hu Plig (Soul Calling)—Calling back every soul in the family to unite with the family
Txi Xwm Kab (Honoring Xwm Kab)—Offerings to the God of Wealth
Neeb Foob Yeem/Neeb Tso Qhua—Shamanistic Ritual to release the Curing spirits of She-Yee for “vacationing"—occurs only if the specific family has a shaman in the house
Noj peb caug (Eat 30)—The main meal of New year
Pe Tsiab (Asking for Blessings from Elders)—Occurred early morning during New Year’s day, including parents, uncles, father/moth-in-law, and dead ancestors
Ntxuav Kauv Laug (Cleaning the Body)—To cleanse the body of dirtiness
Ntuag Qhauv—A ritual to get rid of problems, issues, temper, loneliness, and all the bad things which have occurred in the household
Lwm Qaib/Sub—Using a chicken, a ritual also
Tog Neej Tsa Tuaj Noj Tsiab—Request special guests (such as father-in-law, son-in-law, etc.) to come “eat Tsiab,” a very big “eat 30”.
Xa Noob Ncoos/Tsoog Laug—A very special “thanksgiving” event where parents and in-laws are honored
Tam Noob Ncoos—A thank you feast from parents and in-laws
Tso Plig—To release the souls of all dead ones
Noj Tsiab (eat tsiab)—a very big “eat 30,” involving pigs, cows, and buffalo.

The list above is what a Hmong New Year is.  All these things take place for only 3 days.  After all these things are done, then the “outside” fun begins, which has nothing to do with Hmong New Year.  In the United States, people refer to the “outside” event as “new year”—but, this is a misconception.  Hmong New Year occurs in-house, and whatever occurs outside after the “new year” is called “Tsa Hauv Toj”—meaning “raising the mountain.”  This is the tradition where Hmong toss balls and sing “kwv txhiaj.”

During the Tsa Hauv Toj celebration, Hmong dress in traditional clothing and enjoy Hmong traditional foods, dance, music, bullfights, and other forms of entertainment. Hmong New Year celebrations preserve Hmong ethnic traditions and culture, and may also serve to educate those who are interested in Hmong tradition.  Hmong New Year celebrations occurred anytime within or close to the end of the harvesting period give or take a few days.  However, the Tsa Hauv Toj event is based on the lunar calendar, typically in November and December (which would consider a month ahead of the western calendar).

Clothing
Many tribes are distinguished by the color and details of their clothing.  Black Hmong wear deep indigo-dyed hemp clothing that includes a jacket with embroidered sleeves, sash, apron, and leg wraps.  The Flower Hmong are known for very brightly colored embroidered traditional costumes with beaded fringe.

An important element of Hmong clothing and culture is the paj ntaub, (pronounced pun dow) a complex form of traditional textile art created using stitching, reverse-stitching, and reverse applique. Traditionally, Hmong designs were ornamental, geometric, and non-representational, being that they did not allude to nor contain any symbols that related to real-world objects, with the occasional exception of flower-like designs. Paj ntaub creation is done almost exclusively by women. Paj ntaub are created to be sewn on to Hmong clothing as a portable expression of Hmong cultural wealth and identity.  The main traditional functions of paj ntaub are in funerary garments, where the designs are said to offer the deceased spiritual protection and guide them towards their ancestors in the afterlife, and for the Hmong New Year celebration. In the new year celebration, new paj ntaub and clothes are made by women and girls as it was seen as bad luck to wear clothes from a previous year, and they would serve as an indicator of the women’s creativity, skill, and even propensity as a successful wife.

Sports

Crossbow
Hmong people have traditionally used the Austroasiatic crossbow for waging war and hunting game. Today, crossbow has become an ethnic sport of the Hmong and regular shooting competitions are organized.

Spin-Top
Hmongs play a sport called tuj lub (pronounced too loo), or "spin-top", which resembles aspects of baseball, golf, and bocce. Tuj lub is played on a field 70 feet or longer, with large spinning tops 4 to 5.25 inches in height. Two teams of six players compete. Players spin or fling their top at the opposing team's tops using a length of thread attached to a two-foot stick, earning points by striking the opposing team's tops.  A game lasts eight stages, and in each stage, the players must strike tops further away. It is traditional to play tuj lub on the first three days of the Hmong new year. An annual tuj lub competition between Hmong American teams is held annually in Saint Paul, Minnesota, where the city installed a tuj lub court in 2016.

See also

Hmong churches
Hmong funeral
Hmong music
Hmong textile art
The Spirit Catches You and You Fall Down, a book by Anne Fadiman about the cultural and religious comparisons and misunderstandings between a Hmong refugee family and the California health care system.
 Hmong Archives

References

External links
My big, fat Hmong wedding
Bulk, Jac D. "Hmong History, Customs and Culture---In Brief Racial and Ethnic Minorities  (Sociology 225)-." (Archive) University of Wisconsin-La Crosse.
Lecture on Hmong shamanism by Txongpao Lee, Executive Director of Hmong Cultural Center in Saint Paul, MN (11 min.)
Street Style Vietnam: Hmong Fashion